POC most commonly refers to:
 Person of color or people of color
 Proof of concept, used to demonstrate the feasibility of an idea
 Point of contact, in an organization

POC, PoC, P.O.C. or POc may also refer to:

Business
 Paid outside closing, money paid in real estate transactions not included in calculations
 Percentage-of-completion method, a work-in-progress evaluation
 Production office coordinator, in film and television production

Medicine
 Point of care, designating a service or product given at a medical-services facility
 Portable oxygen concentrator, a medical oxygen source
 Products of conception, tissue resulting from the union of an egg and sperm

Organizations and companies
 Philippine Olympic Committee, the National Olympic Committee of the Philippines
 Professional Officer Course, of the US Air Force Reserve Officer Training Corps program
 Provisional Organizing Committee to Reconstitute a Marxist-Leninist Communist Party in the United States, a splinter of the Communist Party USA
 POC Sports, a Swedish manufacturer

Science and technology
 Particulate organic carbon, carbon particles too large to pass through a filter
 Products of combustion, the chemicals formed by burning materials in oxygen
 Proof-of-capacity, an algorithm used to mine the Burstcoin digital cryptocurrency
 Proto-Oceanic language (POc), the protolanguage ancestral to the Oceanic languages
 Push to talk over cellular (PoC), a service to use a cellphone as walkie-talkie

Other uses
 Brackett Field, a public airport a mile (2 km) southwest of La Verne, California; IATA airport code POC

 Prisoner of conscience, anyone imprisoned because of their race, sexual orientation, religion, or political views
 Pakistan Origin Card, issued to persons of Pakistani origin

See also
 Pock, a surname
 Pok (disambiguation)